The Translators Association (TA) is an association representing literary translators in the United Kingdom. The Translators Association is affiliated with the International Federation of Translators (FIT).

History
The Translators Association (TA) was established in 1958 as a specialist group within the Society of Authors, a trade union for professional writers,  The TA was set up  to provide translators with an effective means of protecting their interests and sharing their concerns. The TA is a source of professional advice, a representative for individuals, and an advocate for the profession as a whole.

The TA administers prizes for published translations of full-length work of literary merit and general interest from the following languages into English: Arabic, Italian, German, French, Spanish, Portuguese, modern Greek, Dutch or Flemish, and Swedish. Japanese was formerly also included.

The TA is run by a committee of 11 elected members. The current (2021) committee members are: Kari Dickson and Christina MacSweeney (co-chairs), Ruth Ahmedzai Kemp, Rebecca DeWald, Marta Dziurosz, William Gregory, Rosalind Harvey, Sawad Hussain, Vineet Lal, Natasha Lehrer - and Roland Glasser (ex-officio).

Previous committee members include Anthea Bell, Peter Bush, Robert Chandler, Charlotte Collins, Howard Curtis, Daniel Hahn, Nicky Harman, Antonia Lloyd-Jones, Ruth Martin, Samantha Schnee, Ros Schwartz, Jamie Lee Searle, Trista Selous, Deborah Smith, Ruth Urborn, Helen Wang.

 Translators Association - 60 Years of Classic Translation
A special series, curated by Charlotte Collins to celebrate the 60th anniversary of the TA.

 Translators on the Cover
An open letter issued by the Society of Authors in September 2021, and signed by authors and translators, to campaign for translators' names to placed on the cover the works they translate (#TranslatorsOnTheCover)

Administered prizes
The Saif Ghobash Banipal Prize (for translation from Arabic)
The Vondel Prize (for translation from Dutch)
The Scott Moncrieff Prize (for translation from French)
The Schlegel-Tieck Prize (for translation from German)
The Goethe-Institut Award for New Translation (for translation from German)
The John Florio Prize (for translation from Italian)
The Hellenic Foundation for Culture Translation Prize (for translation from Greek)
The Calouste Gulbenkian Prize (for translation from Portuguese)
The Premio Valle Inclán (for translation from Spanish)
The Bernard Shaw Prize (for translation from Swedish)

References

External links

Translators Association Site
English To Dutch Translation

Trade unions in the United Kingdom
Translation associations of the United Kingdom
Organizations established in 1958
1958 establishments in the United Kingdom
Literary translators